Loudoun Valley High School (more commonly known as Valley) is a public secondary school in Purcellville, Virginia. It is part of Loudoun County Public Schools. Before the opening of Woodgrove High School in 2010, it was the sole high school for the western half of Loudoun County (which includes Purcellville, Hamilton, Round Hill, Lovettsville, Hillsboro, Middleburg, Philomont and Bluemont).

History
Loudoun Valley opened in 1962. Throughout its history, Valley has remained a predominantly rural high school, maintained a small enrollment of roughly 800 students, and did not experience much of the sprawl that eastern Loudoun County experienced in the 1980s and 1990s. Until the 1999–2000 school year, Valley was the smallest high school in Loudoun County.

Recently, due to immigration, Valley has begun to experience a high rate of growth similar to eastern Loudoun schools like Park View and Broad Run. In 2002, Harmony Intermediate School opened as a school for eighth and ninth graders, making Valley a 10th–12th grade school. By the 2005–2006 school year, Valley had become the largest Loudoun County high school with 1,955 students. Valley had extreme overcrowding until a new western Loudoun County high school, Woodgrove High School, opened in September 2010.

At this time, Loudoun Valley returned to having 9th–12th grades, and Harmony Intermediate School became Harmony Middle School, with 6th–8th grades. Loudoun Valley graduated its largest class in its—as well as in the county's—history in 2011, graduating 558 students.

The current principal is Susan Ross. Ross was at the center of controversy in regards to grade tampering and grade inflation during the 2013–2014 academic school year after an article was posted in the Leesburg Today, and subsequently picked up by the Loudoun Times Mirror and Washington Post, claiming that teachers felt bullied and harassed into inflating grades. As of May 2019, the reputation of Ross has seen further decline, with local parents protesting outside of the school and creating an online petition calling for her removal as the principal of Loudoun Valley.

Accreditation and test scores

Accreditation

Loudoun Valley High School is a fully accredited high school under the Virginia Department of Education's Standards of Learning tests.

SAT scores
Loudoun Valley regularly scores above the national average and the statewide average.

Enrollment history

Athletics

Valley's mascot is a Viking, and its sports teams play in the Dulles District during regular season play. In the post-season, they compete in the Dulles District, VHSL Class 4 Region C, and the VHSL Class 4 for state.

District and region affiliations

Athletics
Loudoun Valley High School's marching band is known as the Loudoun Valley Marching Vikings. The Marching Vikings consist of music students from Loudoun Valley High School and Blue Ridge Middle School. They compete in 4A competition in USBands and VBODA and group 2 competition in VMBC during the fall months. The percussion and color guard also compete in AIA Indoor Percussion during the winter and spring months.

The Loudoun Valley High School cross country team was ranked #1 in the country coming into the 2017 cross country season. They were undefeated all season and won their state meet with a perfect 15 points. They went on eventually to win the Nike Cross Nationals XC Meet with an all time low of 89 points. In the 2018 season they remained undefeated throughout the whole season, once again; winning the Nike Cross Nationals XC Meet with a new all time low of 77 points.

State championships

Loudoun Valley has won twelve AA state team championships:
three in women's volleyball (2000–2001; 2001–2002; 2004–2005)
two in softball (2003; 2005)
one in women's track & field (1976)
one in baseball (1972)
one in golf (1994)
one in men's lacrosse (2004)
one in men's swimming (2004)

Loudoun Valley has won one AAA state championship:
women's volleyball (2009–2010).

Loudoun Valley has won two 3A state championships:
one in baseball (2014)
one in men's track & field (2015)

Loudoun Valley has won nineteen 4A state championships:
one in men's lacrosse (2015)
five in men's cross country (2015–2019)
four in women's cross country (2018–2021)
one in men’s basketball (2018)
three in men's indoor track & field (2018–2020, 2022)
four in men's outdoor track & field (2017–2019, 2021)
one in women's indoor track & field (2020)
one in women's outdoor track & field (2021)

Loudoun Valley has won five AA sportsmanship awards:
three in volleyball (1999–2000; 2002–2003; 2004–2005)
two in women's basketball (1993–1994; 1994–1995)

Rivalries
Valley's traditional rival is Loudoun County High School in Leesburg, but this rivalry has died down since the opening of Heritage High School in Leesburg in 2002.

After Loudoun Valley's move to Group AAA in 2005, both Valley and County in 2006 agreed not to play games against each other for an indefinite time, making the rivalry nearly obsolete. Fellow Loudoun County school Stone Bridge also joined Group AAA in 2005, however, and rivalries have intensified between the two schools in many sports—such as football, volleyball, and softball—where both schools have strong programs.

With the opening of Woodgrove High School as the second Western Loudoun school in the 2010–2011 year, Valley and Woodgrove will play annually for the Western Cup.

Redistricting and reclassification controversy (2005–2007 playing cycle)
Before the 2005–2006 to 2006–2007 redistricting cycle, Valley was determined to be in Group AAA and was expected to join the Northern Region with fellow district member Stone Bridge. They met very strong resistance with member schools. After several heated debates, Stone Bridge joined the Liberty District and Valley to the National District as a tournament-only member. The move was highly controversial among the National District's membership, because they were on an average of 50 miles or more from Valley. This was remedied with Valley's reassignment to the Cedar Run District and Northwest Region in 2007, which was welcomed by most Northern Region members.

Redistricting and reclassification (2013–2015 playing cycle)
Before 2013, the Virginia High School League assigned teams to local districts, regions, and one of three state groups: A for small schools, AA for medium schools, and AAA for large schools. The districts were used for regular season play and the first round of post-season playoffs. In 2013, the Virginia High School League reclassified the system so that there were six state groups, 1A, 2A, 3A, 4A, 5A, and 6A, with the smallest being 1A and the largest being 6A.

They switched from geographically-located districts to school-size based conferences for post-season playoffs, keeping the districts for regular season play. As part of this transition, Loudoun Valley was moved from state group AAA to 3A, remained in the Dulles District, and joined Conference 28. Loudoun Valley was later bumped up to state group 4A and joined Conference 21B in 2015.

Notable alumni
Mark Herring, 48th attorney general of Virginia
Drew Hunter (class of 2016), signed a ten-year contract with Adidas to run professional track; former high school record holder for the indoor mile, 1500m run and 3000m run; Footlocker National Cross Country Champion - 2015
Rob Jones (class of 2003), United States Marine and athlete
Jimmye Laycock (class of 1966), head coach of the College of William and Mary football team
Blair Brown Lipsitz, volleyball player for Penn State who won four consecutive NCAA national championships 2007, 2008, 2009, and 2010.
Chip Roy (class of 1990), Republican congressman representing Texas
Clara Schwartz, convicted murderer

References

Educational institutions established in 1962
Public high schools in Virginia
Schools in Loudoun County, Virginia
Purcellville, Virginia
1962 establishments in Virginia